Online tutoring is the process of tutoring in an online, virtual, or networked, environment, in which teachers and learners participate from separate physical locations. Aside from space, literature also states that participants can be separated by time.

Online tutoring is practiced using many different approaches for distinct sets of users. The distinctions are in content and user interface, as well as in tutoring styles and tutor-training methodologies. Definitions associated with online tutoring vary widely, reflecting the ongoing evolution of the technology, the refinement and variation in online learning methodology, and the interactions of the organizations that deliver online tutoring services with the institutions, individuals, and learners that employ the services. This Internet-based service is a form of micropublishing.

Concept and definitions

An institution, website or individual can offer online tutoring through an internal or external tutoring website or through a learning management systems (LMS). Online environments applied in education could also involve the use of a virtual learning environment platform such as Moodle, Sakai, WebCT, Blackboard. Some of these are paid systems but some are free and open source such as Google+ Hangouts. Online tutoring may be offered either via a link in an LMS, or directly through the tutoring service's platform, where the subscriber may be required to pay for tutoring time before the delivery of service. Many educational institutions and major textbook publishers sponsor a certain amount of tutoring without a direct charge to the learner.

Tutoring may take the form of a group of learners simultaneously logged in online, then receiving instruction from a single tutor, also known as many-to-one tutoring and live online tutoring. This is often known as e-moderation, defined as the facilitation of the achievement of goals of independent learning, learner autonomy, self-reflection, knowledge construction, collaborative or group-based learning, online discussion, transformative learning and communities of practice. These functions of moderation are based on constructivist or social-constructivist principles of learning.

Another form of tutoring, called peer tutoring, connects peers, such as recent or fellow students within a course or subject, tutoring each other, and this may also be conducted as online tutoring over an online conferencing interface.

Most commonly, however, individual learners or their parents either purchase tutoring time with a private vendor of online tutoring service. Such time may also be made available through the purchase of a book, access to a library, a textbook publisher, or enrollment in a particular school or school system. This is known as one-on-one tutoring.

Asynchronous online tutoring is tutoring offered in a format in which the learner submits a question and the tutor responds at a later time. This is appropriate to detailed review of writing, for instance. It also enables cautious learners to retain control over how they submit questions and request assistance. The learner and the tutor need not be online at the same time.

Synchronous online tutoring involves a shared interface, such that both the tutor and the learner (or a group of learners) are online at the same time. This requires implementation of browser-based software and may or may not require the learner to download proprietary software. Some online tutoring services use telephonic or VOIP communication, and/or video communication. WebRTC technology is making it easier to tutor online by delivering live video and audio streaming through the browser. This eliminates the common friction points for user in terms of signing up, inviting students, and downloading external plugins.

There are a number of private firms that provide online tutoring. A third-party online tutoring service offering asynchronous one-on-one tutoring was available as early as 1996.

From the very beginning of online tutoring, controversy surrounded several concerns voiced by educators and parents. Researchers recognized that online tutoring required three components:
 online tutors adopt a specific pedagogy (educational method),  encompassing both instructional and social support or  group development;
 online tutoring management coordinates and organizes the implementation of the service; and
 unlike traditional face-to-face tutoring, online tutoring requires a usable user interface and technical support to maintain both the hardware and the software sides of the operation.
The questions raised by online tutoring include:
 How does a parent or teacher know that the online tutor is qualified to give help, as opposed to simply giving answers to the learner?
 Assuming the online tutor is qualified as an instructor, how does online tutoring relate to course instruction?
 How reliable is the interface? Will it accommodate the discussion of the tutored material at a comparable level to a traditional classroom setting?

Within higher education, tutoring is considered to be adult-to-adult guidance within a specific course or subject for the clear purpose of advancing learning competence in an area of study. Generally, a tutor is an academic, a lecturer or professor who has responsibility for teaching in a degree/diploma program in a university or vocational teaching and learning setting. Learning centers at post-secondary school campuses may incorporate either e-moderating or one-to-one online tutoring, or both, creating a distance learning program, whether or not the campus or student courses are conducted online. In distance learning, tutors may be recruited specifically for the role of teaching and supporting students through online tutoring. Inheriting the role of the tutor, the online tutor must have excellent online communication skills and the ability to discern learning objectives, and must guide students successfully towards the attainment of those objectives. This form of tutoring may vary from primary instruction to assistance with assigned coursework.

State of the art

Online tutoring presupposes a self-motivated and independent learner. The learning aspect of tutoring outweighs the teaching aspect. E-moderating usually refers to group online or web-based learning that

 is based on constructivist and social-constructivist principles;
 focuses on using online dialogue and peer learning to enrich learning within the online environment;
 focuses on achieving goals of independent learning, learner autonomy, self-reflection, knowledge construction, collaborative or group-based learning, online discussion, transformative learning and communities of learning, as opposed to delivering online content via a transmission medium; and
 is also a way of adding extra value and service to traditional educational services (postal services can be expensive and slow, yielding to the cost-effectiveness and speed of online resources).

The main advantage of private one-to-one tutoring was described by Benjamin Bloom (educator and psychologist) in 1984 in Two sigmas problem. The effect described by Bloom appears to carry over into online tutoring, although there is limited research to support this conclusion. In a rare study comparing the performance of students with access to online tutoring with that of students who did not have access to online tutoring remarked on the apparent tendency of the availability of online tutoring appeared to encourage students to stay in a course.

Research is being completed using capability matrices to evaluate students. Once evaluated, the students are clustered into groups with like capabilities. Once grouped, the students can participate in online tutoring with students with similar capabilities allowing a group setting and participation. The capability matrices are then run again to track the changes in capability and track learning.

Practice

Differences between online and face-to-face tutoring 

In both online and face-to-face tutoring, similarities lie in the areas of group dynamics, need for roles within the group and design to encourage in-group interaction. Differences include the need for more facilitation to help structure discussions, with group roles emerging more slowly in the online setting.

There is a spectrum of intervention in online discussions from occasional guidance (assignment assistance) to full-scale design and support of learning groups and tasks (instruction). The first of these is known as tactical online tutoring and the second as strategic online tutoring.

Tactical online tutoring

Tactical tutors are expected to display sensitivity to group interactions and progress, or the lack thereof, and to respond within an online interaction at critical moments in which their mastery of the subject and ability to explain it is requested by the learner or in which the learner makes manifest errors. They are more likely than strategic tutors to be employed in one-on-one interfaces. Asynchronous tutoring allows a tutor to convey insight into strengths and weaknesses of a learner's work. Synchronous or live tutoring can provide help at the moment the learner becomes conscious of a problem and logs in.

Private online tutoring services

In general, academic online tutors are available through various virtual learning environments to help learners answer questions on specific subject matter, to help in the writing of essays, and to assist with research. Offerings vary from sites loosely associated with campuses, to sites directly contracted by and operating in concert with educational institutions, textbook publishers, or libraries. Access to the publisher or campus-provided online tutoring may be limited to just a few hours.

Other major concerns of parents or teachers in making use of online tutoring services include:
 the perceived indifference of an online tutor to a learner's developmental issues that reach beyond a single session;
 cultural communication difficulties that might arise between remote tutors and a local learner; and
 doubts as to the academic qualifications of the online tutor, even if certified by a corporation.

Strategic online tutoring

Strategic tutors do more prior planning, including determining the number of learners per group and membership. Smaller groups are more likely to cultivate trust, whereas a larger group provides for greater heterogeneity and promotes interaction and task achievement.  Six is reported to be the smallest size for good online work, and fifteen is the maximum for full participation. For strategic online tutoring, full participation depends upon robust connectivity and efficient use of bandwidth to guarantee full participation.

Design for group learning

The prior design of online activities, sometimes known as e-tivities, is one aspect of strategic tutoring. E-tivities promote peer group learning and result in less online tutoring time. E-tivities have the following characteristics:
 they can optimise student engagement if they are authentic and relevant learning activities;
 they can take any form of structured participative group work online; and
 they are based on one key topic or question to make online e-moderating easy and to provide motivation, engagement and purpose.

Worksheets, online bulletin boards, and threaded discussions are examples of tools for e-tivities. An e-tivity may be an effective learning tool if it has an illustrative title, a stimulus or challenge, involves invitations to learners to post messages, is carefully timed, has postings to which others can add, and summaries, critiques or feedback from the e-moderator.

Online tutors can take a similar approach using podcasts.

Scaffolding

Two necessary assumptions about online tutors is that they possess academic qualification sufficient to educate and that they have specific training to meet the challenges of online communication. Online tutors also need to be aware of the stages learners usually employ in the online environment; these stages determine the kinds of scaffolding (help) that is appropriate for learners at each stage. Salmon (2004) suggests five stages for learning and scaffolding appropriate to each:

 Access and motivation
 Online socialization
 Information exchange
 Knowledge construction
 Development

Critical success factors

Training and development

Staff who are inexperienced online will inevitably try to transfer into online tutoring what has worked for them in the past or what they believe is the only valid method for their discipline. Further, the values embedded in many commonly used VLEs contribute to counterproductive behaviors for online tutoring.

The key competencies needed by tutors are the abilities to:

 support group learning within the technology without the need for face-to-face meetings or pictures;
 provide scaffolding (see above);
 perceive and interpret online behaviors;
 weave, which includes:
 Emphasizing a point to show wider application
 Collecting snippets up from different messages and/or present in a new way
 Redirecting questions to stimulate critical thinking and deeper learning
 Highlighting contributions that link with others in ways the group has not noticed
 Agreeing or disagreeing with group contributions
 Correcting misunderstandings or insufficiency
 Summarize, which includes:
 Acknowledging the variety of ideas expressed in contributions
 Refocusing discussion, particularly where there are many contributions that stray from a central point
 Signaling closure
 Providing fresh starting points
 Reinforcing important contributions or ideas
 Providing an archive
 give feedback;
 classify participants' knowledge;
 add knowledge and correct misconceptions in a timely manner where necessary; and
 close discussions and move on.

The key features for staff development are online and face-to-face in character:

 Online training
 Gain facility with the medium of online communication and with the specific user interface to be used 
 Model the online communication behavior expected of learner participants and students
 Focus efforts on tutoring and moderating processes and methods and away from details of the technology
 Use scaffolding (supporting ideas) that facilitates collaborative learning in preference to providing direct instruction
 Face-to-face
 Focus on peer dialogue around models that are applicable in many settings 
 Provide authentic situations for tutors to practice weaving, summarizing, and giving feedback
 Use fellow tutors as a resource when online development hits an obstacle

Dealing with characteristics of online environments

Online interaction is essentially verbal, so that nonverbal cues, often considered essential to the tutoring process, are not present. For example, in a text transferred back and forth online (asynchronous paper review), facial expressions, body movements and eye contact are not present. Both the tutor and the learner may need experience with the medium to get used to this. However, face-to-face meetings are not actually essential, since, with training, online tutors can exploit features of the online environment to communicate in new ways, such as by sketching on whiteboards or using a shared online calculator. The learner may be invited to reflect on the discussion or consult specific resources.

The learner, too, may more consciously prepare a message in advance, and may choose to log in to "meet" with the tutor according to his or her own schedule. Both synchronous (live) and asynchronous online tutoring typically preserve an online record of tutor remarks or a tutoring session. The learner can use this record for future reference.

Self-led teams 

As students become more experienced at working together online, some of the online facilitation roles can be delegated to the students. However, the students will need advice and training in order to become successful collaborators.

Advice and training for self-led teams should include:
 Establishing ground rules
 Developing a shared sense of vision and purpose
 Allocating roles, task and responsibilities
 Communicating openly and frequently
 Offering support
 Meeting deadlines
 Reviewing team performance and reflecting on contributions

Current developments

Online tutoring environments are moving beyond those offered by synchronous and asynchronous discussion technology, as often offered by VLEs. New opportunities for online tutoring are offered by Web 2.0 systems and multi-user virtual environments.

Web 2.0

Web 2.0 encompasses the use of the web in increasingly interactive ways, with social networking and user-generated content being two critical benefits.  Social networks can be used to connect tutors and students, and can allow students to help each other on a peer-to-peer basis.  User-generated content can be created by and used by both tutors and students.

Online tutors may use Web 2.0 applications to render their online tutoring more flexible and current. For example, podcasts provide the advantage of the human voice, ease of use and mobile access to instruction (Salmon and Edisiringha 2008), and blogs may provide access to newly developed topics that can spur debate. Some online tutoring sites incorporated such tools into their interfaces even before Web 2.0 phenomena were widely discussed.

Multi-user virtual environments

Research is just beginning on the use of multi-user virtual environments (e.g. Second Life) and the role of avatars as Second Life tutors and learners.

Automated tutors

Online tutoring is one area for the application of various theories and implementations of tutoring provided to students by a computer. Companies involved in automated online tutoring include Wolfram Alpha, with its module called The Problem Generator (PG) Cognitive Tutor, and others. All automated tutoring involves an application of some form of artificial intelligence to emulate human tutoring, generate appropriate responses, and guide students interaction from one level of learning to the next.

The comparison of human and machine tutoring is an active area of study. For instance, it is unclear as of this time whether Cognitive Tutor is effective at improving student performance.

COVID-19
The COVID-19 crisis of 2020 and the ensuing lock downs in many countries have led to increased online tutoring by both established online tutoring agencies as well as traditional schools adapting to the new environment. This has led to challenges on the technological site, but also for teachers not used to teaching online and parents not used to working from home with their children around.

For those who do have access to the right technology, there is evidence that learning online can be more effective in a number of ways. Some research shows that on average, students retain 25–60% more material when learning online compared to only 8–10% in a classroom.

See also 
 Distance education
 Live online tutoring
 Peer mentoring
 Tutorials

References

Further reading
 Bender, T. (2003). Discussion-based online teaching to enhance student learning: Theory, practice and assessment. Stylus: Sterling, Virginia.
 Benson, P. (2001). Teaching and researching autonomy in language learning. London: Longman.
 Collison, G., Elbaum, B., Haavind, S. & Tinker, R. (2000). Facilitating online learning: Effective strategies for moderators. Atwood Publishing, Madison.
 Hewitt, B. L. (2010). The online writing conference: a guide for teachers and tutors. Boynton/Cook Heinemann, Portsmouth, NJ.
 Kozar, O (2012) The use of synchronous online tools in private English language teaching in Russia, Distance Education, 33(3), p 415-420
 Mama, R. (2001) Preparing social work students to work in culturally diverse settings, Social Work Education 20 (3): 373-82
 Palloff, R. M. & Pratt, K. (2007). (2nd edition). Building online communities: Effective strategies for the virtual classroom. John Wiley and Sons.
 Salmon, G. (2002). E-tivities. The key to active online learning. London: Routledge Falmer.
 Redding, L (2009) "On-line tutoring?" Home Tutoring Online

External links 
 

 
E-learning